Goulburn–Murray Water, the trading name of the GoulburnMurray Rural Water Corporation, a statutory authority of the Victorian Government, provides bulk water storage and supply services to people of Northern Country/North Central Victoria and the Southern Riverina regions in Australia.

GoulburnMurray Water is managed by a managing director who reports to a Board of Management that are ultimately responsible to the Minister for Water, presently Lisa Neville. The Department of Environment, Land, Water and Planning provides administrative oversight of the statutory authority.

In 2011 it was reported that GoulburnMurray Water had an operating shortfall of 80 million in its budget.

See also

 Murray-Darling Basin Authority
 Water security in Australia
 Water supply and sanitation in Australia
 Murray River
 Goulburn River

References

Water companies of Victoria (Australia)
Government agencies established in 1989
1989 establishments in Australia
Murray-Darling basin